ORU, Oru or Õru can refer to:

Orbital replacement unit, used on the International Space Station
Orbital replacement unit (HST), used on the Hubble Space Telescope
Oral Roberts University, a university in south Tulsa,  Oklahoma
Orange & Rockland Utilities, a subsidiary of Consolidated Edison in New York
Otago Rugby Union
Oru, polite Japanese verb- see keigo
Observational Results (Unsolicited), a message type of the Health Level 7 standard.
Juan Mendoza Airport, with IATA code ORU

Places in Estonia
Oru, Kohtla-Järve, an exclave district of Kohtla-Järve
Oru, Lääne County, village in Lääne-Nigula Parish, Lääne County
Oru, Ida-Viru County, village in Viru-Nigula Parish, Ida-Viru County
Oru, Harju County, village in Kose Parish, Harju County
Õru, small borough in Valga Parish, Valga County
Oru Palace, former presidential residence in Toila, Ida-Viru County
Oru Parish, former municipality in Lääne County
Õru Parish, former municipality in Valga County